The Whawanui River is a river of the Wellington Region of New Zealand's North Island. It is one of the southernmost rivers in the North Island.

The river reaches the sea close to White Rock, which is formed of calcilutite in a Paleocene limestone. Richard Barton set up White Rock as a sheep station in 1847. Banded dotterel nest near the beach.

See also
List of rivers of New Zealand

References

External links 
 1930s photos of White Rock station and the river
 2010 Google Street View of White Rock from Whawanui River bridge

Rivers of the Wellington Region
Rivers of New Zealand